Phantasis ardoini is a species of beetle in the family Cerambycidae. It was described by Stephan von Breuning in 1967. It is known from Namibia and Angola.

References

Phantasini
Beetles described in 1967